The Acalypheae is a tribe of the subfamily Acalyphoideae, under the family Euphorbiaceae. It comprises 12 subtribes and 32 genera.

Genera

See also
Taxonomy of the Euphorbiaceae

References

External links

 
Euphorbiaceae tribes